The 1967 Australian Drivers' Championship was an Australian motor racing competition open to Australian National Formula cars and  Australian 1½ Litre Formula cars. It was authorised by the Confederation of Australian Motor Sport (CAMS) as an Australian National Title  with the winner awarded the 1967 CAMS Gold Star. It was the 11th Australian Drivers' Championship to be awarded by CAMS.

The championship was won by Spencer Martin driving a Repco Brabham BT11A-Coventry Climax. Martin won two of the first four races and finished second in the other two. Despite not finishing the fifth race and not starting the sixth, he finished seven points ahead of Greg Cusack (Repco Brabham BT23A-Repco). Third was Kevin Bartlett (Repco Brabham BT11A-Coventry Climax).

In addition to Martin's two race wins, single victories were taken by Cusack, Bartlett, Leo Geoghegan (Lotus 39-Repco) and Frank Gardner (Brabham BT23D-Alfa Romeo).

Calendar
The championship was contested over a six race series.

Points system
Championship points were awarded on a 9-6-4-3-2-1 basis to the first six placegetters in each race. Points from any five of the six races could be counted towards a driver's total. Only drivers racing under a CAMS General Competition License were eligible for the championship.

Championship results

Note:
 New Zealander Graeme Lawrence placed 3rd at Surfers Paradise and 4th at Sandown but was not eligible to score championship points.
 British-based Australian Frank Gardner placed 1st at Warwick Farm but was not eligible to score championship points.

References

External links
 1967 Australian "open wheeler" images from www.autopics.com.au

Australian Drivers' Championship
Drivers' Championship